Ling Liang Church E Wun Secondary School is a co-educational Chinese-language aided high school located in Tung Chung, Islands District, Hong Kong. It was founded in 2002, and is operated by the Ling Liang World-wide Evangelistic Mission (Ling Liang Church) of Hong Kong.

School organisation
The chairman of the School Management Committee is Ms. Tsang Ngar Yee  and the principal is Mr.Ip June Kit.
 
The school motto is Faith, Hope, Love.

Academics
Ling Liang Church E Wun is one of four high schools participating in the Hong Kong New Literacies Project.

Awards
Fidelity Winners 2011: Hong Kong Schools - Year One Winners.

References

External links
 

Educational institutions established in 2002
Tung Chung
2002 establishments in Hong Kong
Protestant secondary schools in Hong Kong